Nenad Marinković (born 28 September 1988) is a Serbian retired professional footballer, who played as a winger.

Club career
Marinković joined Partizan in 2001. He was one of the most promising youngsters at both club and national level, playing together in generation with Miloš Bosančić and Miralem Sulejmani, among others. On 5 December 2004, Marinković made his first team debut in a 3–1 home win over Čukarički, becoming the youngest ever player to appear for the club at 16 years and 68 days, breaking a 15-year-old record held by Dejan Marković. He signed his first professional contract with Partizan in December 2005, agreeing to a three-year deal. However, Marinković failed to make an impact in the first team, also being loaned for several times during his contract.

In the summer of 2010, Marinković moved to Smederevo. He appeared in all 15 league games and scored four goals in the fall season, securing a transfer to Israeli club Bnei Yehuda Tel Aviv in February 2011. Marinković spent the following two and a half years at the club, scoring 14 league goals in 80 appearances.

In June 2013, Marinković was transferred to Swiss club Servette. He left the club after less than three months, making a return to Israeli football by signing with Hapoel Acre.

On 8 August 2014, Marinković returned to Partizan, on a two-year deal. He was loaned to Voždovac in the summer of 2015, before signing a permanent contract with the club in January 2016.

On 11 June 2017, Marinković signed with Mladost Lučani.

International career
Marinković represented Serbia at the 2007 UEFA European Under-19 Championship in Austria.

Personal
His older brother is Nebojša Marinković.

Notes and references

External links

 
 

1988 births
Living people
Serbia and Montenegro footballers
Serbian footballers
Association football forwards
FK Teleoptik players
FK Partizan players
FK Banat Zrenjanin players
OFI Crete F.C. players
FK Smederevo players
Bnei Yehuda Tel Aviv F.C. players
Servette FC players
Hapoel Acre F.C. players
FK Voždovac players
Gaziantep F.K. footballers
FK Mladost Lučani players
FK Rad players
FC Tyumen players
FK Mačva Šabac players
FK Sileks players
Israeli Premier League players
Serbian SuperLiga players
Swiss Challenge League players
TFF First League players
Russian Second League players
Macedonian First Football League players
People from Knjaževac
Serbia under-21 international footballers
Serbian expatriate footballers
Expatriate footballers in Greece
Expatriate footballers in Israel
Expatriate footballers in Switzerland
Expatriate footballers in Russia
Expatriate footballers in Turkey
Expatriate footballers in North Macedonia
Serbian expatriate sportspeople in Greece
Serbian expatriate sportspeople in Israel
Serbian expatriate sportspeople in Switzerland
Serbian expatriate sportspeople in Russia
Serbian expatriate sportspeople in Turkey
Serbian expatriate sportspeople in North Macedonia
FK Partizan non-playing staff